Max Martin Fisher (July 15, 1908 – March 3, 2005) was an American businessman and philanthropist. He was a benefactor/alumnus of the Fisher College of Business at Ohio State University. He spent much of his life raising money for philanthropic and political endeavors and was a supporter of charitable and civic organizations. His skill at diplomacy made him an advisor on Middle East and Jewish issues to every administration from President Dwight D. Eisenhower's to President George W. Bush's.

Life and career
Fisher was born in Pittsburgh, Pennsylvania, to Russian Jewish immigrant parents and grew up in Salem, Ohio, where his father owned a clothing store. He attended The Ohio State University on a football scholarship and graduated with a degree in business administration in 1930.  While a student at OSU, he was initiated into the Alpha Epsilon chapter of the Phi Beta Delta fraternity, which is now part of the Pi Lambda Phi fraternity.  In 1930, Fisher joined his father's Keystone Oil Refining Company, a motor oil reclamation business, in Detroit as a $15-a-week salesman before forming his own company in 1932. He grew the business, Aurora Gasoline, into one of the largest gas station chains in the Midwest before selling the business in 1959 to Marathon Oil, after serving for 27 years as its chair.

Following the sale of Aurora to Marathon Oil for $40 million, Fisher invested his fortune in real estate after retiring from business in 1963 where he sat on the board of Comerica, the consumer and investment bank, Sotheby's, and United Brands, in addition to serving as the Honorary Chairman of United Jewish Communities (UJC), Council of Jewish Federations, and the American Jewish Committee. He supported Jewish and general causes worldwide and played a major role in almost every major Jewish communal organization. He was also the subject of articles, debates, TV documentaries, and a biography, entitled Quiet Diplomat by Peter Golden.

For decades Fisher also served as a trusted advisor to U.S. presidents and Israeli prime ministers, rallying for causes from the Six-Day War to Ethiopian Jewry. By quietly forging new ties between Washington and Jerusalem, he pioneered a new era in American Jewish activism and politics and was considered the elder statesman of North American Jewry. Jimmy Carter invited him to watch the signing of the Camp David Accords in 1977.

He was a delegate from Michigan at the 1964, 1968, 1976 Republican National Conventions, and an alternate in the 1988 Republican National Convention.

Philanthropic activities 
In Detroit, Fisher backed the $60 million Max. M. Fisher Music Center, which serves as the home for the Detroit Symphony Orchestra and includes a public high school for the performing arts center called The Max. In 1977, he joined with Taubman and Henry Ford II to buy the  Irvine Ranch south of Los Angeles for $337 million; Fisher's group would sell the property six years later for an estimated $1 billion.

He also leveraged around $20 million to finance Ohio State University's Fisher College of Business for development of a new six-building business campus that opened in 1998. An additional pledge of $5 million was given to the Fisher College of Business in February 2005 to support Master of Business Administration programs.

Fisher served as national chairman of UJC's predecessor organizations, the United Jewish Appeal (UJA) from 1965 to 1967; president of the Council of Jewish Federations from 1969 to 1972; and chairman of the United Israel Appeal, Inc. (UIA) from 1968 to 1971; and president of the Jewish Federation of Metropolitan Detroit from 1959 to 1964.

In addition to being honorary chair of UJC, he was founding chairman of the board of governors of UJC's overseas partner, the Jewish Agency for Israel (JAFI). He was also active in the American Jewish Committee, B'nai B'rith International, and Hebrew Immigrant Aid Society.

Personal life and family
Fisher was married twice:

In 1934, he married Sylvia Krell who died in 1952. They had one child:
 Jane Fisher Sherman - former chairman of the United Israel Appeal, Inc. (UIA) and former co-chair of the Jewish Agency for Israel Committee on Israel.

In 1953, he married Marjorie Faith Switow. They had two children together: 
 Julie Fisher Cummings 
 Marjorie Fisher Aronow

Switow also had two children from her prior husband, George Allen Frehling, whom Fisher adopted:
 Mary Fisher - AIDS activist
 Philip William Fisher - In 2009, he founded the charity Mission Throttle whose purpose is "to develop business tools and to brainstorm ways of creating systematic and positive change to speed the pace of assistance to underserved populations."

Fisher has 15 grandchildren and 13 great-grandchildren.

He died March 3, 2005, at about 11:30 am in his home in Franklin, Michigan, surrounded by family and is interred at the Clover Hill Park Cemetery in Birmingham, Michigan.

Fisher financed the schooling of his nephew Stephen M. Ross, who called him, "the most important role model and inspiration for me in life".

Wealth

In 2004, Max Fisher had amassed a net worth of $775 million. At 96, he was the oldest member of the Forbes 400.

Legacy

Historical documents
Max Fisher's papers are available for public research at the Walter P. Reuther Library in Detroit, Michigan. The library's website explains that, "This large collection documents Fisher's life and career as a successful Detroit industrialist and investor, influential Republican Party fundraiser and power broker, Jewish community leader, and major philanthropist. It includes correspondence, documents, speeches, interviews, photographs and other media, and documents from his biographer."

B'nai B'rith Youth Organization (BBYO) Involvement
In March 2006, a male chapter of BBYO was founded by 12 young men from the state of Michigan with the name of Max Fisher AZA (AZA standing for Aleph Zadik Aleph, the male sector of the organization). Following the foundation, the chapter was officially recognized by the Fisher Foundation in early April. The chapter's charter number is #337.  Since Fisher's charter in 2006, the chapter has flourished at the chapter, regional, and international level.  Four times has a member from Fisher AZA served as the President for all of Michigan Region BBYO; even though the chapter has only been around for 10 years, an International President has already hailed from Fisher.  Fishermen always set the standard for how to behave in BBYO; in fact, they have won the Sportsmanship award at Michigan Region's Regional Convention many times since its founding.  Each year several members represent Michigan Region by attending BBYO's International Convention in February, and by attending countless summer programs around the globe each summer, many of which focus on building leadership skills. Fisher has won several awards, including the Henry Monsky award which recognizes the most outstanding chapters across the International Order.  On a more local level, each year several Fishermen apply for individual awards including the Bronze and Silver Stars of David (recognizing outstanding participation) and the Tree of Life Award (recognizes those individuals who bring more members into the order via recruiting).  Additional awards are available for those who excel in community service as well.  Recently, Fisher has received publicity for starting a Platform Database which hosts several hundred platforms of individuals' candidacy for office from around the world.  The platforms range from the chapter level, to the regional and international levels as well.

Telegraph Road
On November 30, 2005, President George W. Bush signed the 2006 appropriations bill related to the US Department of Transportation and other agencies. Contained in that law was a provision that named a  stretch of Telegraph Road (U.S. Route 24) from I-96 to its northern end at I-75 the "Max A. Fisher Memorial Highway"; the highway was dedicated in May 2008.

References

External links
Membership on 2004 Forbes 400
Max M. Fisher Papers at the Walter P. Reuther Library

1908 births
2005 deaths
American businesspeople in the oil industry
American people of Russian-Jewish descent
Businesspeople from Ohio
Heads of the Jewish Agency for Israel
Jewish American philanthropists
People from Salem, Ohio
Ohio State University Fisher College of Business alumni
United States Football League executives
People from Franklin, Michigan
20th-century American philanthropists
20th-century American businesspeople
20th-century American Jews
21st-century American Jews